Dolia may refer to:
 Dolia, Odisha, a village in India
 Dolianova, historically Dolia, a town in Italy
 Dolia River, a river in Romania
 Dolia (plant), or Nolana, a genus of plants
 Dolia (vessels), a type of earthenware of ancient Rome
 , or Dola, a figure in Slavic mythology

See also 
 Dolea
 Dolya (disambiguation)